Syzygium kuranda, commonly known as cherry penda, cherry satinash or kuranda satinash, is a tree of the family myrtaceae native to north eastern Queensland.

It has simple shiny dark green leaves that are paler on the underside. The leaf blade is lance-like to elliptical in shape narrow at the base and with a blunt point at the tip.

Found in an area along the east coast of Queensland between Cooktown and Tully usually in areas of well established rainforest.

References

Myrtales of Australia
Trees of Australia
Flora of Western Australia
kuranda
Plants described in 1983
Taxa named by Bernard Hyland